Sphenophryne cornuta is a species of frogs in the family Microhylidae. It is endemic to New Guinea where it is widespread and found both in the Western New Guinea (Indonesia) and Papua New Guinea. Common name horned land frog has been proposed for it.

Description
Adult males measure  and females  in snout–vent length. Each eyelid bears a small but distinct, pointed tubercle, making this species easy to recognize. The fingers have enlarged discs that are larger than those on the toes. The loreal region is flat and vertical, distinct from the flat upper surface of the pointed snout.

Sphenophryne cornuta breeds by direct development, and the male carries its babies on its back.

Habitat and conservation
Sphenophryne cornuta inhabits tropical rainforests at elevations below . It hides in leaf litter and under logs during the day, and calls from bushes and saplings in understorey at night. It also lives in disturbed habitats including gardens and degraded forests.

Sphenophryne cornuta is a common and very widespread species. It faces no known threats.

References

cornuta
Endemic fauna of New Guinea
Amphibians of Western New Guinea
Amphibians of Papua New Guinea
Taxa named by Wilhelm Peters
Taxa named by Giacomo Doria
Amphibians described in 1878
Taxonomy articles created by Polbot